is a female given name, which exists most commonly in Japanese, but may be found elsewhere.

Possible writings
Risa can be written using different kanji characters and can mean:
梨彩, "pear, coloring"
梨沙, "pear, sand"
梨紗, "pear, silk gauze"
里沙, "village, sand"
里紗, "village, silk gauze"
理沙, "reason, sand"
理佐, "reason, aid"
理紗, "reason, silk gauze"

The name can also be written in hiragana or katakana.

People
, Japanese actress and gravure idol
, Japanese voice actress
, Japanese announcer
, Japanese fashion model
, Japanese idol and tarento
, Japanese idol
Risa Hontiveros (born 1966), Filipino socialist activist, politician, and journalist
Risa Horowitz (born 1970), Canadian visual and media artist
, Japanese volleyball player
, Japanese manga artist
, Japanese actress
Risa Kawano, Japanese drummer
, Japanese model and actress
Risa L. Goluboff, American lawyer and legal historian
Risa Lavizzo-Mourey (born 1954), American doctor
, Japanese javelin thrower
, Japanese voice actress
, Japanese singer and actress
, Japanese women's basketball player
, Japanese actress and voice actress
, Japanese singer
, Japanese vocalist
, Japanese tennis player
Risa Rosales (born 1998) American Mentor for Verizon Wireless
, Filipino-Japanese volleyball player
, Japanese professional wrestler and actress
, Japanese long-distance runner
, Japanese gravure idol
, Japanese actress and voice actress
, Japanese football player
, Japanese volleyball player
, Japanese volleyball player
, Japanese figure skater
, Japanese squash player
, Japanese idol
, Japanese long-distance runner
, Japanese voice actress
, Japanese voice actress
, Japanese idol and model
, Japanese novelist
Risa Wechsler, American physicist
, Japanese gravure idol and singer

Fictional characters 

Risa Harada (梨紗), character from the anime and manga series, D.N.Angel
Risa Koizumi, character from the anime and manga series, Lovely Complex
Risa Kanzaki, character from the anime and manga series, Neighborhood Story and Paradise Kiss
Lisa, character from the animated film, Ponyo
Risa Shindo, a character from the film Battle Royale II: Requiem
Risa Ward, character from the young adult science fiction novel Unwind (novel) by Neal Shusterman
Lisa Imai, character from mixed-media franchise, BanG Dream!
Risa Onda, a character in the horror video game, Forbidden Siren
Risa, a character from the animated film, Pokémon the Movie: The Power of Us

See also
Lisa

Japanese feminine given names
English feminine given names